The Drysdale gudgeon (Kimberleyeleotris notata) is a species of fish in the family Eleotridae endemic to the Kimberley region of Australia, where it is only known from the Drysdale River system. It inhabits rocky pools and slow flowing streams. It has a light brown to purplish coloration, whitish along the belly. A series of dark brown to black bars are present along the sides, which become V-shaped towards the posterior.

References

External links
 Fishes of Australia : Kimberleyeleotris notata

Drysdale gudgeon
Near threatened animals
Drysdale gudgeon
Taxonomy articles created by Polbot